Milan Petrović (born 26 August 1961) is a Slovenian football manager who most recently managed Rudar Velenje.

Career

Between 2010 and 2011, Petrović was the manager of Slovenian PrvaLiga club NK Primorje. After that, he coached ŽNK Olimpija Ljubljana, ŽNK Rudar Škale, and Arema. In 2019, he was appointed head coach of Badak Lampung in the Indonesian Liga 1, a position he held until 2020.

References 

1961 births
Living people
Slovenian football managers
Slovenian expatriate football managers
Expatriate football managers in Indonesia
Slovenian expatriate sportspeople in Indonesia
NK IB 1975 Ljubljana managers
NK Primorje managers
Badak Lampung F.C. managers
NK Rudar Velenje managers